It is a 1989 Soviet comedy film directed by Sergei Ovcharov and based on the satirical novel The History of a Town by Mikhail Saltykov-Shchedrin. While Saltykov-Shchedrin's novel was written in the 19th century, It was filmed as a satire on the Soviet Union, which is portrayed in the film in a dystopian and surreal way.

Plot 
The film tells the story of the development of the city of Glupov.

Cast 
 Rolan Bykov as Ferdyshchenko
 Natalya Gundareva as Klementinka de Burbon
 Svetlana Kryuchkova as Amaliya Stokfish
 Elena Sanaeva as Iraida
 Margarita Terekhova as Anelka Lydohovskaya
 Yuriy Demich as Ugryum-Burcheev
 Leonid Kuravlyov as Borodavkin
 Rodion Nahapetov as Erast Grustilov (as Rodion Nakhapetov)
 Oleg Tabakov as Brudasty
 Olga Pashkova as Alyona Osipova
 Vyacheslav Tsoy

References

External links 
 

1989 films
1980s Russian-language films
Soviet comedy films
1989 comedy films